Enoplognatha thoracica is a spider species with Holarctic distribution. It is notably found in Lithuania.

See also
 List of Theridiidae species

References

Theridiidae
Spiders of Europe
Spiders described in 1833
Holarctic spiders